Royal Air Force Kingsnorth or more simply RAF Kingsnorth is a former Royal Air Force Advanced Landing Ground in Kent, England. It is not to be confused with RNAS Kingsnorth, later RAF Kingsnorth, which was an airship station in operation during and after the First World War.

Opened in 1943, Kingsnorth was one of a number of prototype temporary Advanced Landing Ground airfields to be built in France after D-Day, as the Allied forces moved east across France and Germany. Kingsnorth was used by British, Dominion and the United States Army Air Forces until it was closed in September 1944.

Today the airfield is agricultural land with few remains visible on the ground, although sections of the runways can clearly be made out on aerial and satellite photos.

History
The USAAF Ninth Air Force required several temporary Advanced Landing Ground (ALG) along the channel coast prior to the June 1944 invasion of Normandy to provide tactical air support for the ground forces landing in France.

RAF Fighter Command use

USAAF use

Kingsnorth was known as USAAF Station AAF-418 for security reasons by the USAAF during the war, and by which it was referred to instead of location.  Its USAAF Station Code was "KN".

36th Fighter Group 
The availability date of 1 April 1944 was achieved and between the 4th and 6th of that month approximately 1,500 men of the 36th Fighter Group arrived at Kingsnorth airfield from Scribner Army Airfield, Nebraska flying Republic P-47 Thunderbolts. Operational fighter squadrons and fuselage codes were:
 22d Fighter Squadron (3T)
 23d Fighter Squadron (7U)
 53d Fighter Squadron (6V)

The 36th Fighter Group was part of the 303d Fighter Wing, XIX Tactical Air Command.

Movement to the Continent commenced during the first week of July when the 53rd Fighter Squadron transferred to its Advanced Landing Ground (ALG) at Brucheville, France (ALG A-16) as a forward base. The other two squadrons continued to operate from Kingsnorth until early August, the main body of the group preparing to move on the 2nd. Within a few days all personnel were gone and the airfield was deserted.

Current use
With the facility released from military control, the former airfield was returned rapidly to agricultural use and within a very short period there was little to indicate that RAF Kingsnorth had existed. Today the only evidence of the airfield's existence is a slight outline of the southeast end of runway 13, visible in aerial photographs.

Directions
Kingsnorth Airfield is on the east side of the A2070 just south of Ashford, about 1 mile south of Bad Munsterfeld road just after the loop heading southwards. The main airfield was in the field northwest of Bliby Corner crossroads, although the runways can be traced to south of Chequertree Lane.

See also

List of former Royal Air Force stations

References
Citations

Bibliography

 Freeman, Roger A. (1994) UK Airfields of the Ninth: Then and Now 1994. After the Battle 
 Freeman, Roger A. (1996) The Ninth Air Force in Colour: UK and the Continent-World War Two. After the Battle 
 Jefford, C G. RAF Squadrons, first edition 1988, Airlife Publishing, UK, .
 Maurer, Maurer (1983). Air Force Combat Units of World War II. Maxwell AFB, Alabama: Office of Air Force History. .
 USAAS-USAAC-USAAF-USAF Aircraft Serial Numbers--1908 to present
 British Automobile Association (AA), (1978), Complete Atlas of Britain, 

Airfields of the IX Fighter Command in the United Kingdom
Royal Air Force stations in Kent